James Collins (29 May 1896 – 13 October 1990) was an Australian rules footballer who played 30 games with Essendon in the Victorian Football League (VFL).

Notes

External links 

1896 births
1990 deaths
Australian rules footballers from Melbourne
Essendon Football Club players
Yarraville Football Club players
People from Footscray, Victoria